Minuscule 92 (in the Gregory-Aland numbering), A12 (Soden), known as Codex Faeschii 1, is a Greek minuscule manuscript of the New Testament, on parchment leaves. Palaeographically it has been assigned to the 10th century. It has marginalia.

Description 

The codex contains the text of the four Gospel of Mark, with a commentary, on 141 parchment leaves. The text is written in one column per page, 31-32 lines per page.

Latin  (chapters) were added by a later hand.

The text of the Catholic epistles is only in some passages.

Text 

The Greek text of the codex is a representative of the Byzantine text-type. Aland placed it in Category V.

History 

In 1485 the manuscript belongs to John Camerarius, bishop of Worms. It once belonged to Andreas Faesche in Basel. It was examined by Johann Jakob Wettstein and Dean Burgon. C. R. Gregory saw it in 1885.

The manuscript is dated by the INTF to the 10th century.

It is currently housed at the Basel University Library (O. II. 7) in Basel.

See also 

 List of New Testament minuscules
 Biblical manuscript
 Textual criticism

References 

Greek New Testament minuscules
10th-century biblical manuscripts